Komoran or Komolom is an island just south of the much larger Yos Sudarso near the south coast of New Guinea in South Papua province, Indonesia. Its area is 695 km².

Islands of Western New Guinea
Landforms of South Papua